Iridodonesis is the vibration or agitated motion of the iris with eye movement. This may be caused by lens subluxation, the incomplete or partial dislocation of the lens; or by aphakia, the absence of a lens. The term originated from irido- + doneo (to shake to and fro).

See also
Phacodonesis

References

External links

Ophthalmology